The Tudor Crown, also known as Henry VIII's Crown, was the imperial and state crown of English monarchs from around the time of Henry VIII until it was destroyed during the Civil War in 1649. It was described by the art historian Sir Roy Strong as "a masterpiece of early Tudor jeweller's art", and its form has been compared to the crown of the Holy Roman Empire.

Description
Its date of manufacture is unknown, but Henry VII or his son and successor Henry VIII probably commissioned the crown, first documented in writing in a 1521 inventory of Henry VIII's jewels, naming the crown as "the king's crown of gold". More elaborate than its medieval predecessor, it originally had two arches, five crosses pattée and five fleurs-de-lis, and was decorated with emeralds, sapphires, rubies, pearls, diamonds and, at one time, the Black Prince's Ruby (a large spinel). In the centre petals of the fleurs-de-lis were gold and enamel figurines of the Virgin Mary, St George and three images of Christ.  In an effort by Henry VIII to secure his position as head of the new Church of England the figures of Christ were removed and replaced by three Kings of England: St Edmund, St Edward the Confessor and Henry VI, who at that time was also venerated as a saint. The crown was mentioned again in 1532, 1550, 1574 and 1597.

Fate
After the death of Elizabeth I and the end of the Tudor dynasty, the Stuarts came to power in England. Both James I and Charles I are known to have worn the crown. Following the abolition of the monarchy and the execution of Charles I in 1649, the Tudor Crown was broken up and its valuable components sold for £1,100. According to an inventory drawn up for the sale of the king's goods, it weighed 7 lb 6 oz troy.

One of the royal figurines may have survived: a statuette of Henry VI matching the contemporary depiction of the crown was uncovered in 2017 by metal detectorist Kevin Duckett. The location, "at Great Oxendon ... between Naseby and Market Harborough", was on the route taken by Charles I of England as he fled after the Battle of Naseby and may have been lost at that time. The figurine was likely featured on Henry VIII's crown according to some sources. As of February 2021, the figure was being held at the British Museum for assessment and further research. According to historian and Charles I biographer Leanda de Lisle, "the crown was melted down on the orders of Oliver Cromwell but it is believed the figurine – which was one of several adorning the royal treasure – could already have been removed".

Use in heraldry

From 1902 to 1953, a stylised image of the Tudor Crown was used in coats of arms, badges, logos and various other insignia throughout the Commonwealth realms to symbolise the Crown and the monarch's royal authority.

In 2022, Charles III chose a cypher using this Tudor Crown.

Replica
In 2012, a replica of the crown, based on research by Historic Royal Palaces, was made by the retired royal jeweller Harry Collins, using authentic Tudor metalworking techniques and 344 pearls and gemstones. It is exhibited as part of an exhibition in the Royal Chapel at Hampton Court Palace.

See also
 Imperial State Crown
 Crown Jewels of the United Kingdom

Notes

References

External links

 The Making of Henry VIII's Crown a video by Historic Royal Palaces
 Download a 3D digital model at Thingiverse

Crown Jewels of the United Kingdom
Individual crowns